Clinidium sculptile is a species of ground beetle in the subfamily Rhysodinae. It was described by Edward Newman in 1838. It is endemic to the eastern United States, primarily Appalachia. It has been recorded on pitch pine (Pinus rigida) and tulip tree (Liriodendron tulipifera).

Clinidium sculptile measure  in length.

References

Clinidium
Beetles of the United States
Endemic fauna of the United States
Beetles described in 1838
Taxa named by Edward Newman